Fuenferrada is a town and municipality in Aragon, located in the comarca of Cuencas Mineras, in the province of Teruel. According to the 2005 census (INE), the municipality has a population of 43 inhabitants, with an area of 24.22 km2 and a density of 1.77.

The municipality is 73 kilometres from Teruel, the provincial capital.

References 

Municipalities in the Province of Teruel